Kim Dae Yeol (born 12 April 1987) is a South Korean football midfielder, who plays for Ansan Greeners in the K League 2, the second tier of football in South Korea. He made his professional debut in 2010 for Daegu FC, and has since played for Sangju Sangmu and Daejeon Citizen.

Club career
Kim, a draftee from the 2010 K-League draft intake, joined Daegu FC for the 2010 season.  His professional debut was in an away match in the K-League Cup against Busan I'Park on 6 June 2010, a match which ended in a win for the visitors. His debut in the K-League itself was in a loss at home to Suwon Samsung Bluewings on 18 July 2010. He earned three yellow cards in his first four K-League matches. After limited appearances during the 2011 season, he was a regular starter for Daegu in 2012, and scored his first goal in Daegu's 3–0 win over the Chunnam Dragons on 14 June.

Club career statistics

References

External links

1987 births
Living people
Association football midfielders
South Korean footballers
Daegu FC players
Gimcheon Sangmu FC players
Daejeon Hana Citizen FC players
Ansan Greeners FC players
K League 1 players
K League 2 players
Korea National League players